Evermeet: Island of Elves is a fantasy novel by Elaine Cunningham, set in the world of the Forgotten Realms, and based on the Dungeons & Dragons role-playing game. It was published in hardcover in April 1998 and in paperback in March 1999.

Plot summary
The Island of Evermeet is a refuge for the elves, which faced hordes capable of destroying empires, and was in turn threatened by pirates, mercenaries, wizards, elves and renegades swarms of dragons. The novel gives us fragments of the history of the island kingdom, from its inception to the present day, while the drow launch a devastating attack.

Reception
One reviewer commented: "Evermeet Island of Elves by Elaine Cunningham is basically THE history of the elven races and their homelands within the Forgotten Realms world."

Reviews
Review by Chris Gilmore (1998) in Interzone, #137 November 1998

References

1998 American novels
Forgotten Realms novels
Novels by Elaine Cunningham